The Tordrillo Mountains are a small mountain range in the Matanuska-Susitna and Kenai Peninsula Boroughs in the southcentral region of the U.S. state of Alaska.
The highest point is Mount Torbert. On a clear day, they are easily visible from Anchorage.

The Tordrillos are bordered on the south by the Chigmit Mountains, the northernmost extension of the Aleutian Range. (The Tordrillos are sometimes counted as part of the Aleutian Range, but this is not official usage.) On the west and north they meet the southern tip of the Revelation Mountains, part of the Alaska Range, while on the east they fade into the hills and lowlands of southcentral Alaska. The north side of the range feeds the Skwentna River, and the south drains into Chakachamna Lake and the Chakachatna River.

The Tordrillos are primarily a volcanic range, like most of the neighboring Aleutian Range; however some of the peaks (for example, Mount Torbert) are not volcanoes. Mount Spurr, the southernmost peak in the range, had its most recent eruption in June 1992. They are heavily glaciated, partly due to their location near Cook Inlet. Major glaciers include the Capps Glacier, Triumvirate Glacier, Hayes Glacier, and Trimble Glacier.

Despite their proximity to Anchorage, the Tordrillos see little recreational or climbing activity. However, Mount Spurr and nearby Crater Peak are regularly visited and monitored by the Alaska Volcano Observatory.

Named peaks of the Tordrillo Mountains
 Mount Torbert
 Mount Gerdine
 Mount Spurr
 Mount Nagishlamina
 Hayes Volcano
 Crater Peak (A subsidiary peak of Mount Spurr)

Gallery

Notes

External links
 Alaska Volcano Observatory
 Tordrillo Mountains on Topozone
 

Mountain ranges of Alaska
Mountains of Kenai Peninsula Borough, Alaska
Mountains of Matanuska-Susitna Borough, Alaska